Cactus Flower may refer to:

 Cactus Flower (play), a farce by Abe Burrows
 Cactus Flower (film), a 1969 comedy film directed by Gene Saks adapted from the play
 Cactus Flower (2017 film), a 2017 drama film directed by